Bridge in Radnor Township No. 1 is a historic stone arch bridge that carries Goshen Road over Darby Creek to Darby Paoli Road in Radnor, Delaware County, Pennsylvania. It features an unfinished stone parapet cap. It spans the Darby Creek.

It was listed on the National Register of Historic Places in 1988.

References 

Road bridges on the National Register of Historic Places in Pennsylvania
Bridges completed in 1905
Bridges in Delaware County, Pennsylvania
National Register of Historic Places in Delaware County, Pennsylvania
1905 establishments in Pennsylvania
Stone arch bridges in the United States